Smethwick Rangers Football Club is a football club based in Smethwick, West Midlands, England.

History
The club first joined the West Midlands (Regional) League in 1996 under the name Smethwick Rangers, initially playing in Division One South. In their second season in the division they were champions and were promoted to the Premier Division, where they remained until 2006.

In 2000 the club changed its name to Warley Rangers after signing a sponsorship deal with Warley Accident Repair Centre. In the same season former Wolverhampton Wanderers player Robbie Dennison served as their player-coach.

In 2001 they reverted to their former name, but a year later they changed their name again, this time to Smethwick Sikh Temple. As a predominantly Asian team, they have competed in the UK Asian Football Championships, and in 1994 they played at Villa Park in the final of the Aston Villa Cup, a tournament for local teams hosted by the Premier League club. In 2005 they reverted to the name Smethwick Rangers.  After dropping out of the league in 2006 they re-surfaced in the Midland Football Combination in 2008 under the name Smethwick Town, and were subsequently known as AFC Internazionale and AFC Smethwick before reverting to their present name in 2013. In 2010 they switched back to the West Midlands (Regional) League and won promotion twice in three seasons to return to the Premier Division. In 2015 Smethwick Rangers were crowned UK Asian Champions after beating IGFC Singh Sabha Hounslow at Ibrox. In the 2015–16 season Smethwick signed former Dinamo II București player Albert Alexandru, who led the club to the West Midlands (Regional) League Premier Division Cup, beating Wolverhampton Sporting Community 1–0 in the final at Long Lane Park. In the 2016–17 season Smethwick finished runners-up in the West Midlands Regional League Premier Division Cup as they lost to league winners Haughmond 1–0.

For the 2017–18 season the club changed its name once more, this time to Smethwick to establish themselves as the number one club from the diverse area of Smethwick. They have also added Ahmed Ali a UEFA B Qualified coach and former Manchester United and England Schoolboy Stephen Cooke to the backroom staff. On 9 September 2017 Smethwick won their first ever game in the FA Vase beating Malvern Town 4–1, Joshua Small, Nathan Stone, Beni Kiembi and Stuart Hillman scoring the goals.

In December 2018 Hayden Foote, former assistant manager at Bilston Town was appointed manager alongside Darsh Ram.  After a poor start to the season, Foote decided to depart and return to Bilston Town.  Grant Joshua was appointed as first team manager with Chris Rabone and Ross Harris coming in as assistant managers. At the end of the 2020–21 season the club were transferred to Division One of the Midland League when the Premier Division of the West Midlands (Regional) League lost its status as a step six division. In 2021, the club was once again renamed, this time to its current name, Smethwick Khalsa Football Federation with Manraj Singh Sucha appointed as manager in September, 7 games into the season. The team finished the 2021/22 season in 13th position, only losing 3 games from January 2022 onwards.  A year later in summer 2022, the club reverted to the name Smethwick Rangers.

Club records
 Best league position: 5th in West Midlands (Regional) League Premier Division, 1998–99
 Best FA Cup performance: none
 Best FA Vase performance: none

References

External links

Football clubs in England
Football clubs in the West Midlands (county)
Sport in Sandwell
Smethwick
West Midlands (Regional) League
Midland Football League
Diaspora association football clubs in England